Oxford High School is a public high school in Oxford, Connecticut, United States, operated by Oxford Public Schools. In spring 2013, there were 592 students enrolled in grades 9 to 12.

References

External links 
 

Oxford, Connecticut
Schools in New Haven County, Connecticut
Public high schools in Connecticut
2007 establishments in Connecticut
Educational institutions established in 2007